Kahur Deraz (also Romanized as Kahūr Derāz; also known as Kahūrdāz) is a village in Golashkerd Rural District, in the Central District of Faryab County, Kerman Province, Iran. At the 2006 census, its population was 124, in 26 families.

References 

Populated places in Faryab County